Peter William Pullicino (born 17 June 1976) is a former professional footballer who last played for Marsaxlokk. Born in Australia, he represented the Malta national team.

Honours

Hibernians
Winner
 2001–02 Maltese Premier League
 2006 Maltese Cup

Marsaxlokk
Winner
 2006–07 Maltese Premier League
 2009–10 Maltese First Division

Career statistics
Statistics accurate as of match played 1 August 2009.

External links
 Peter Pullicino at MaltaFootball.com
 
 

1976 births
Living people
Soccer players from Sydney
Australian soccer players
Australian expatriate soccer players
Australian people of Maltese descent
People with acquired Maltese citizenship
Maltese footballers
Malta international footballers
Maltese expatriate footballers
Maltese people of Italian descent
Hibernians F.C. players
Msida Saint-Joseph F.C. players
Marsaxlokk F.C. players
Maltese people of Australian descent
Association football midfielders
Fraser Park FC players